

The Pazmany PL-9 Stork is an American single-engined high-wing monoplane designed by Ladislao Pazmany as a ¾ scale variant of the Second World War Fieseler Storch for the home builder market.

Design and development
The PL-9 Stork features a strut-braced high-wing, a two-seats-in-tandem enclosed cockpit, fixed conventional landing gear, and a single engine in tractor configuration.

The aircraft fuselage is made from welded steel tubing, while the wings are constructed from aluminum sheet. The standard engine used is the  Lycoming O-320 four-stroke powerplant.

Specifications

See also

References

Notes

Bibliography

External links

1990s United States civil utility aircraft
Homebuilt aircraft
PL-09
Single-engined tractor aircraft
High-wing aircraft